Lauren Willig is a New York Times bestselling author of historical novels. She is best known for her "Pink Carnation" series, which follows a collection of Napoleonic-Era British spies, similar to the Scarlet Pimpernel, as they fight for Britain and fall in love.

Biography 
A native of New York City, Willig discovered historical fiction when she was only six years old, while she was attempting to find books about her idol, Eleanor of Aquitaine.

After graduating from the Chapin School, Willig attended Yale University, where she majored in Renaissance Studies and Political Science, and was Chairman of the Tory Party of the Yale Political Union. She then studied graduate level early modern European history at Harvard University before entering and graduating from Harvard Law School. Willig briefly worked for Cravath, Swaine & Moore, a law firm in New York, while authoring her "Pink Carnation" series of books, until she gave up law in order to focus full-time on the series.

Willig's books have been named a Romantic Times Top Pick! and she has been nominated for a Quill Award in 2006.  She has won the RITA Award for Best Regency Historical Romance, the RT Reviewers Choice Award for Historical Fiction, the Booksellers Best Award for Long Historical Romance, and the Golden Leaf Award.

In Spring of 2010, Willig taught Reading the Historical Romance at her alma mater, Yale University, along with fellow alumna and romance novelist Andrea DaRif, (penname: Cara Elliott). The course received a great deal of attention for helping to bring the romance novel academic notice.

Since winding up the Pink Carnation series, Willig has written seven stand alone works of historical fiction as well as co-authoring four novels with fellow historical fiction authors Karen White and Beatriz Williams.

Works

The Pink Carnation series 
The Secret History of the Pink Carnation (February 2005) 
The Masque of the Black Tulip (December 29, 2005) 
The Deception of the Emerald Ring (November 16, 2006) 
The Seduction of the Crimson Rose (January 31, 2008) 
The Temptation of the Night Jasmine (January 22, 2009) 
The Betrayal of the Blood Lily (January 12, 2010) 
The Mischief of the Mistletoe (October 28, 2010) 
The Orchid Affair (January 20, 2011) 
The Garden Intrigue (February 16, 2012) 
The Passion of the Purple Plumeria (August 6, 2013) 
The Mark of the Midnight Manzanilla (August 5, 2014) 
The Lure of the Moonflower (August 4, 2015)

Historical fiction 
The Ashford Affair (April 9, 2013) 
That Summer (June 3, 2014) 
The Other Daughter (July 21, 2015) 
The Forgotten Room (with Karen White and Beatriz Williams) (January 19, 2016) 
The English Wife (January 9, 2018) 
The Glass Ocean (with Karen White and Beatriz Williams) (September 4, 2018) 
The Summer Country (June 4, 2019) 
All the Ways We Said Goodbye (with Karen White and Beatriz Williams) (January 14, 2020) 
Band of Sisters (March 2, 2021) 
The Lost Summers of Newport (with Karen White and Beatriz Williams) (May 17, 2022) ISBN 978-0-063-04074-8
Two Wars and a Wedding (March 21, 2023)

Other works 
Two L (August 28, 2011) 
"A Night at Northanger" in Jane Austen Made Me Do It (October 2011) 
"The Record Set Right" in A Fall of Poppies (March 22, 2016) 
"Until We Meet Again" in A Paris All Your Own: Bestselling Women Writers on the City of Light (July 4, 2017)

References

External links 
Willig's website

Living people
Chapin School (Manhattan) alumni
Harvard Law School alumni
21st-century American novelists
American women novelists
American romantic fiction writers
21st-century American women writers
Writers from Manhattan
Women romantic fiction writers
RITA Award winners
Cravath, Swaine & Moore people
Novelists from New York (state)
Year of birth missing (living people)
Harvard Graduate School of Arts and Sciences alumni
Yale College alumni